Triin Aljand (born 8 July 1985) is a retired Estonian swimmer who won a silver medal at the 2012 European Aquatics Championships in 50 m butterfly. She competed in the 2004, 2008 and 2012 Summer Olympics in the 50 m and 100 m freestyle and 100 butterfly, but never reached the finals. She also participated in multiple FINA World Aquatics Championships.

She attended Texas A&M University, where she swam for the women's varsity team. On 21 November 2008 she broke the National Collegiate Athletic Association record for the 50-yard freestyle with her time of 21.61, though the record was disqualified after it was found the pool was just over one inch short.

Records

She set the Estonian national records three times in the 50-m butterfly on 12 December 2008. She set another national record in the 100-m butterfly at the 2008 European Short Course Swimming Championships on 14 December 2008.

Personal
Her twin sister Berit and younger brother Martti are also swimmers. Her father Riho Aljand is a swimming coach, and her grandmother, Ulvi Voog (Indrikson) is a former Olympic swimmer.

She is married to Slovenian swimmer Peter Mankoč. They have a daughter Brina, who was born in 2015.

References

External links
ESBL bio

1985 births
Living people
Estonian female butterfly swimmers
European Aquatics Championships medalists in swimming
Estonian female freestyle swimmers
Olympic swimmers of Estonia
Swimmers from Tallinn
Swimmers at the 2004 Summer Olympics
Swimmers at the 2008 Summer Olympics
Swimmers at the 2012 Summer Olympics
Texas A&M Aggies women's swimmers
Estonian expatriate sportspeople in the United States
Estonian swimming coaches